Western Canada, also referred to as the Western provinces, Canadian West  or the Western provinces of Canada, and commonly known within Canada as the West, is a Canadian region that includes the four western provinces just north of the Canada–United States border namely (from west to east) British Columbia, Alberta, Saskatchewan and Manitoba. The people of the region are often referred to as "Western Canadians" or "Westerners", and though diverse from province to province are largely seen as being collectively distinct from other Canadians along cultural, linguistic, socioeconomic, geographic, and political lines. They account for approximately 32% of Canada's total population. 

The region is further subdivided geographically and culturally between British Columbia, which is mostly on the western side of the Canadian Rockies and often referred to as the "west coast", and the "Prairie Provinces" (commonly known as "the Prairies"), which include those provinces on the eastern side of the Rockies yet west of Ontario - Alberta, Saskatchewan and Manitoba. Alberta and British Columbia are also sometimes subcategorized together, either as the "Rockie Provinces" or "mountain provinces" owing to both hosting large swathes of the mountain range, or due to shared socio-economic, cultural, and demographic factors such as their highly urbanized populations (three of Canada's five largest cities are Calgary, Edmonton, and Vancouver) and significant interprovincial mobility between the two. Alberta and Saskatchewan, having once been united as a single territory, are also sometimes subcategorized together due to shared political and economic histories, as well as similar historic migratory patterns from Eastern Europe.

Capital cities 
The capital cities of the four western provinces, from west to east, are:
 Victoria, British Columbia
 Edmonton, Alberta
 Regina, Saskatchewan
 Winnipeg, Manitoba

With the exception of Winnipeg, which is the largest city in Manitoba, all other Western provincial capitals are located in the second-largest metropolitan areas of their respective province.

Constitutional history 

Western Canada is the traditional territory of Indigenous and First Nations predating the arrival of European colonization. As Britain colonized the West, it established treaties with various First Nations, took control of other areas without opposition and fought with other First Nations for control of Western Canada. Not all lands were ceded by the First Nations to British control and land claims are still ongoing.

In 1858, the British government established the Colony of British Columbia, governing that part of Canada still known as British Columbia. The English government established the Hudson's Bay Company which controlled most of the current area of Western Canada, northern Ontario and northern Quebec, the area known as Rupert's Land and the North-Western Territory. In 1870, the British government transferred the lands of the company to Canada. The area of Western Canada not within British Columbia was established as the Northwest Territories under Canadian control. The Western provinces other than British Columbia were established from areas of the Northwest Territories:

Manitoba established as a province of Canada in 1870, following the enacting of the Manitoba Act.
British Columbia: Under terms that Canada would absorb the colony's debt, would begin to subsidize public work, and would begin to construct a railway allowing travel from British Columbia to Ontario, British Columbia agreed to join Canadian confederation in 1871.
Saskatchewan: Established as province in 1905, with the implementation of the Saskatchewan Act.
Alberta: In 1905, the same year as Saskatchewan, Alberta also was established as province. Just like Saskatchewan had the Saskatchewan Act, Alberta had the Alberta Act.

Demographics 

As of the 2016 Census, the total population of Western Canada was nearly 11.1 million, including approximately 4.65 million in British Columbia, 4.07 million in Alberta, 1.1 million in Saskatchewan, and 1.28 million in Manitoba. This represents 31.5% of Canada's population. Vancouver is the largest metropolitan area in Western Canada at nearly 2.5 million people, while Calgary is largest city proper at over 1.2 million people.

Census metropolitan areas 

As of the 2016 Census, Statistics Canada recognized ten census metropolitan areas within Western Canada, including four in British Columbia, three in Alberta, two in Saskatchewan, and one in Manitoba. The following is a list of these areas and their populations as of 2016.

From 2011 to 2016, the fastest growing CMAs in the country were the five located in Alberta and Saskatchewan: Calgary (+14.6%), Edmonton (+13.9%), Saskatoon (+12.5%), Regina (+11.8%) and Lethbridge (+10.8%). These were the only CMAs in the country to register growth over 10%. The three fastest growing CMAs - Calgary, Edmonton, and Saskatoon - were unchanged from the previous intercensal period.

Geography 

Western Canada consists of the country's four westernmost provinces: British Columbia, Alberta, Saskatchewan and Manitoba. It covers 2.9 million square kilometres – almost 29% of Canada's land area. British Columbia adjoins the Pacific Ocean to the west, while Manitoba has a coastline on Hudson Bay in its northeast of the province. Both Alberta and Saskatchewan are landlocked between British Columbia and Manitoba.

The Canadian Prairies are part of a vast sedimentary plain covering much of Alberta, southern Saskatchewan, and southwestern Manitoba. The prairies form a significant portion of the land area of Western Canada. The plains generally describes the expanses of largely flat, arable agricultural land which sustain extensive grain farming operations in the southern part of the provinces. Despite this, some areas such as the Cypress Hills and Alberta Badlands are quite hilly and the prairie provinces contain large areas of forest such as the Mid-Continental Canadian forests.

In Alberta and British Columbia, the Canadian Cordillera is bounded by the Rocky Mountains to the east and the Pacific Ocean to the west.

The Canadian Rockies are part of a major continental divide that extends north and south through western North America and western South America. The continental divide also defines much of the border between Alberta and British Columbia. The Columbia and the Fraser Rivers have their headwaters in the Canadian Rockies and are the second- and third-largest rivers, respectively, to drain to the west coast of North America. To the west of their headwaters, across the Rocky Mountain Trench, is a second belt of mountains, the Columbia Mountains, comprising the Selkirk, Purcell, Monashee and Cariboo Mountains sub-ranges.

Climate 

The coast of British Columbia enjoys a moderate oceanic climate because of the influence of the Pacific Ocean. Winters are typically wet and summers relatively dry. These areas enjoy the mildest winter weather in all of Canada, as temperatures rarely fall much below the freezing mark. The mountainous Interior of the province is drier and has colder winters, but experiences hotter summers than the more moderate coastal areas.

Alberta has a dry continental climate with warm summers and cold winters. The province is open to cold Arctic weather systems from the north, which often produce extremely cold conditions in winter. Winters are generally quite cold, though some areas can experience a phenomenon known as the "Chinook wind," wherein warm winds raise the winter temperatures temporarily. In contrast, summers can fluctuate from cool to hot and are generally wetter.

Saskatchewan and Manitoba have a continental climate and experience extremes in weather. Winters in both provinces can be classified as harsh with Arctic winds and  temperatures possible. In contrast, summers can be hot with temperatures exceeding  at least once per year in most locations.

Politics

Federal politics 

In Canadian politics, the Conservative leanings of Western Canadians has been known for quite some time, as contrasted with the greater tendencies for candidates from either the Liberal Party of Canada or the New Democratic Party (NDP) to be elected in Central and Atlantic Canada. Exceptions exist, particularly in British Columbia, as well as in the prairie city of Winnipeg, and where the Liberal Party hold seats. The social democratic NDP had its origins on the Canadian Prairies and in the mining and pulp mill towns and railway camps of British Columbia and has a history of support in Manitoba and British Columbia.

The western provinces are represented in the Parliament of Canada by 104 Members of Parliament (MPs) in the House of Commons (British Columbia 42, Alberta 34, Saskatchewan and Manitoba 14 each) and 24 senators (6 from each province). Currently, of the 104 western MPs in the Commons, 64 are Conservatives,  Liberals hold 21 seats, the New Democrats hold 18 and the Greens hold 1.

Western alienation 

Western alienation refers to the notion that western Canada has been excluded economically and politically from the rest of Canada.

Senate reform 
The West has been the most vocal in calls for reform of the Senate, in which Ontario, Quebec, and particularly Atlantic Canada are seen by some westerners as being over-represented. The population of Ontario alone (13.1 million) exceeds that of all the Western provinces combined. The total population of Atlantic Canada, however, is 2.3 million, and this region is represented by 30 senators. Thus, Ontario is under-represented, Quebec has representation proportional to its population and the Atlantic provinces are over-represented. Westerners have advocated the so-called Triple-E Senate, which stands for "equal, elected, effective." They feel if all 10 provinces were allotted an equal number of senators, if those senators were elected instead of appointed, and if the Senate were a body that had more direct political power (for example via an arrangement more similar to the structure of the Australian Senate or the United States Senate rather than the UK model), then their region would have more of its concerns addressed at the federal level. Other westerners find this approach simplistic and either advocate keeping the status quo or may support other models for senate reform. The combination of all of these issues has led to the concept known as Western alienation, as well as calls for Western Canada independence by various fringe groups.

Provincial politics 
Regarding provincial politics, from May 2001 to June 2017, the British Columbia Liberal Party formed the provincial government in British Columbia, though despite the name is not formally allied with the federal Liberal Party and is widely seen as centre-right or conservative in nature. It is also composed of members from the federal Conservative Party's right-wing and many former Reform Party supporters. Following the 2017 provincial election in British Columbia, the British Columbia New Democratic Party formed a minority government with the support of the British Columbia Green Party, following the defeat of Christy Clark's Liberal Party government by a vote of non-confidence. As of October 2020, the BC NDP hold a majority government in the legislature. The Progressive Conservative party holds a majority in the Manitoba legislature. Both Saskatchewan and Alberta hold supermajority governments in their legislatures with the Saskatchewan Party and United Conservative Party, respectively.

Economy 

Energy and agriculture are Western Canada's dominant industries – and this region, with only 11 million inhabitants, is one of the world's largest net exporters of both energy and agricultural commodities. Approximate breakdown:
 
Energy:
 Oil (13% of world reserves; 4% of world production)
 Uranium (8% of world reserves; 20% of world production)
 
Agriculture:
 Potash (60% of world reserves; 30% of world production)
 Wheat, coarse grains, oilseeds (21% of the world export market for wheat; 10% for oilseeds)
 Farmland (80% of Canadian total)

See also 

History of the west coast of North America
American Old West
Western United States
Cascadia
Western Canada Youth Parliament

References

Further reading

External links 

Peel's Prairie Provinces: Sources for Canada and Western Canadian History

 
Regions of Canada